Memorandums taken on a journey from Paris into the southern parts of France and Northern Italy, in the year 1787, or Memoranda, is a text by Thomas Jefferson, written during a trip beginning February 28, 1787 from France to Italy.

Jefferson produced the work as a guide for two young American friends, Thomas Lee Shippen and John Rutledge, following a wine tour of Europe. It consists largely of an extensive discussion of the wine grown throughout southern France and northern Italy. Jefferson excerpted the material from his general travel journals.

Summary
In February 1787, Thomas Jefferson went on a journey which led him through southern France and northern parts of Italy. In his memorandums, Jefferson begins by proposing a route through Italy, France, and Germany. Jefferson also recommends some places for accommodation and describes the finest wines of each area. Some areas mentioned include Nice, Lyons, Tende, Burgundy, Milan, Cassino, Rozzano, Genoa, Noli, Albenga, Languedoc, and Bordeaux. The letter takes on a more serious tone towards its end, where Thomas Jefferson outlines “Objects of Attention for an American.” This part covers French mechanical arts, manufacturing, and agriculture. He, for example, notes that Americans should learn from the French architecture, as the U.S. population was rapidly expanding, it needed longer-lasting houses. He also describes paintings and sculptures as “too expensive for the state of wealth among us. It would be useless, therefore, and preposterous, for us to make ourselves connoisseurs in those arts. They are worth seeing, but not studying.”

References

American travel books
Works by Thomas Jefferson